Daniel Kwaku Amankwah Nkrumah (born 5 November 2003) is an English professional footballer who plays as a forward for EFL League Two side Leyton Orient.

Career
Nkrumah joined Leyton Orient aged eight, and progressed through the age groups before making his senior debut for Orient in the EFL Trophy in the 1–0 win at home to Southampton U21 on 14 September 2021, coming on as a first half substitute for Ruel Sotiriou. He subsequently came on as a second half substitute for Tyrese Omotoye in Orient's next match in the tournament, the 4–0 win at Crawley Town on 5 October.

Nkrumah signed a professional contract with Orient in late September 2021. Manager Kenny Jackett said, "We felt he excelled in pre-season, and has regularly been training with the first team group. Although he’s still 17-years-old, we felt he had earned a professional deal, and to continue to aid his progress in every way we can."

On 6 December 2022, Nkrumah joined National League South side Welling United on a one-month loan deal.

Personal life
Born in London, describing himself as a "local lad from East London", Nkrumah is of Ghanaian descent.

Statistics

References

External links
 

2003 births
Living people
English footballers
Footballers from the London Borough of Redbridge
English people of Ghanaian descent
Association football forwards
Leyton Orient F.C. players
Welling United F.C. players
Black British sportspeople
English Football League players
National League (English football) players